Brian Roy Haas (born March 18, 1974) is an American jazz pianist and founding member of the band Jacob Fred Jazz Odyssey.

Haas spent his formative years in Broken Arrow, Oklahoma, a suburb of Tulsa. He began studying classical piano at age five. He won local and regional piano competitions at a young age. When he was sixteen, he won the Oklahoma Concerto Competition. He performed with the Tulsa Philharmonic. After graduating from high school, he received a scholarship to study classical music at the University of Tulsa, but while in college he became interested in jazz and switched his major.

In January 2011 JFJO recorded a suite of music based on the Tulsa Race Riot. Haas signed with Rykodisc/Hyena Records, which released his first album, The Truth About Hollywood (2005), a combination of Hass's compositions and cover versions of songs by Thelonious Monk.

Discography

References

External links
Official site

American jazz pianists
American male pianists
Aspen Music Festival and School alumni
Living people
1974 births
University of Tulsa alumni
21st-century American pianists
21st-century American male musicians
American male jazz musicians